Lethal(3)malignant brain tumor-like 2 protein is a protein that in humans is encoded by the L3MBTL2 gene.

Model organisms 

Model organisms have been used in the study of L3MBTL2 function. A conditional knockout mouse line called L3mbtl2tm2a(EUCOMM)Wtsi was generated at the Wellcome Trust Sanger Institute. Male and female animals underwent a standardized phenotypic screen to determine the effects of deletion. Additional screens performed:  - In-depth immunological phenotyping

References

Further reading